Sir Hugh Charles Jonathan Godfray CBE FRS (born 27 October 1958) is a British zoologist.  He is Professor of Population Biology at Balliol College, Oxford, Director of the Oxford Martin School and Director Oxford Martin Programme on the Future of Food.

Life
Educated at Millfield and St Peter's College, Oxford, he gained his PhD in community ecology from Imperial College, London in 1983. He remained at Imperial as a post-doc until 1985, when he returned to Oxford as a demonstrator. In 1987 he returned to Imperial as a lecturer until 2006, when he again returned to Oxford, now as a fellow of Jesus College and Hope Professor of Zoology.

He was awarded the Scientific Medal in 1994, and Frink Medal in 2009 of the Zoological Society of London. He was elected Fellow of the Royal Society in 2001. He was appointed Commander of the Order of the British Empire (CBE) in the 2011 New Year Honours. and was knighted in the 2017 Birthday Honours for services to scientific research and scientific advice to government.

His most cited research article, published in Science, studies how to meet the challenge of feeding a growing global population. To date his research has been cited more than 40,000 times.

Studying the malaria problem Godfray and his coworkers presented data suggesting that use of spermless mosquitoes may be a feasible way to control the disease.

Since February 2018 he is the director of the Oxford Martin School and Professor of Population Biology at University of Oxford.

In 2021 he was elected to the American Philosophical Society.

Footnotes

External links 
 https://www.oxfordmartin.ox.ac.uk/about/director/
 http://www.zoo.ox.ac.uk/staff/academics/godfray_hcj.htm
 https://web.archive.org/web/20071212144853/http://www.e-taxonomy.eu/files/cv/sac/cgodfray.pdf

1958 births
Living people
British zoologists
People educated at Millfield
Alumni of St Peter's College, Oxford
Alumni of Imperial College London
Academics of Imperial College London
Fellows of Balliol College, Oxford
Fellows of Jesus College, Oxford
Commanders of the Order of the British Empire
Fellows of the Royal Society
Hope Professors of Zoology
Knights Bachelor
Members of the American Philosophical Society